Justice Namasivayam Nadarajah was a Ceylon Tamil lawyer and judge of the Supreme Court of Ceylon.

Early life and family
Nadarajah was born in 1897. His father was Veerakathipillai Namasivayam, a surveyor. His family were from Valanthalai near Karainagar in northern Ceylon. He was educated at St. Patrick's College, Jaffna and St. Joseph's College, Colombo. After school he joined Ceylon Law College, qualifying as an advocate.

Nadarajah married Thangammah, daughter of Kanagasabai.

Career
After qualifying Nadarajah practised law at the Colombo bar. He was later appointed a judge of the Supreme Court of Ceylon.

Nadarajah died in the 1950s.

References

1897 births
Alumni of Ceylon Law College
Alumni of Saint Joseph's College, Colombo
Alumni of St. Patrick's College, Jaffna
Ceylonese advocates
Ceylonese Queen's Counsel
People from Northern Province, Sri Lanka
British Ceylon judges
Puisne Justices of the Supreme Court of Ceylon
20th-century King's Counsel
Sri Lankan Tamil judges
Sri Lankan Tamil lawyers
Year of death missing